IBF5MAP (5-MAPP) is a substituted amphetamine derivative which is structurally related to drugs such as MDMA and 5-MAPDI, though its pharmacology has not been studied in detail. It is a structural isomer of dihydrobenzofuran derivatives such as 5-MAPDB and 6-MAPDB, but instead has an unusual phthalane core structure.

See also
 Citalopram
 Substituted methylenedioxyphenethylamine

References

Substituted amphetamines
Designer drugs
Entactogens and empathogens
Isobenzofurans